The Spießhorn is a mountain,  high, in the Black Forest just east of the Herzogenhorn. The summit is on the boundary between St. Blasien and Bernau im Schwarzwald. The Spießhorn is largely forested. At the summit is an observation pavilion. To the southwest is a subpeak, the Kleines Spießhorn.

References

External links 

One-thousanders of Germany
Mountains and hills of the Black Forest
Mountains and hills of Baden-Württemberg
St. Blasien